Basic Pictures Ltd. is a Hong Kong production company that was established in 2002 by filmmaker Andrew Lau.  Since its establishment, the company has gone to produce film that include the Infernal Affairs trilogy and other films in which Lau serves as either the director or the producer.

Filmography

References 

Film production companies of Hong Kong
Mass media companies established in 2002
2002 establishments in Hong Kong
Cinema of Hong Kong